Tokaen Island (Marshallese:) is an island in the Marshall Islands. It is one of the many islands that surround the Likiep Atoll lagoon on the southern edge.

References

Likiep Atoll
Islands of the Marshall Islands